In enzymology, a glycylpeptide N-tetradecanoyltransferase is an enzyme that catalyzes the chemical reaction

tetradecanoyl-CoA + glycylpeptide  CoA + N-tetradecanoylglycylpeptide

Thus, the two substrates of this enzyme are tetradecanoyl-CoA and glycylpeptide, whereas its two products are CoA and N-tetradecanoylglycylpeptide. It participates in the N-Myristoylation of proteins, and in vertebrates there are two isoenzymes NMT1 and NMT2.

Besides tetradecanoyl-CoA, this enzyme is also capable of using modified versions of this substrate. In human retina, an even wider range of fatty acids, including 14:1 n–9, 14:2n–6, and 12:0, are accepted by the enzyme and grafted onto guanylate cyclase activators. This is mainly a result of a special set of fatty-acid-CoA substrates available in the retina.

Nomenclature
This enzyme belongs to the family of transferases, specifically those N-acyltransferases transferring groups other than aminoacyl groups (cd04301).  The systematic name of this enzyme class is tetradecanoyl-CoA:glycylpeptide N-tetradecanoyltransferase. Other names in common use include peptide N-myristoyltransferase (NMT), myristoyl-CoA-protein N-myristoyltransferase, myristoyl-coenzyme A:protein N-myristoyl transferase, myristoylating enzymes, and protein N-myristoyltransferase.

Structural studies

The enzyme folds into two domains, each with a double EF-hand arrangement.

References

 

EC 2.3.1
Enzymes of known structure